William Ernest Johnson, FBA (23 June 1858 – 14 January 1931), usually cited as W. E. Johnson, was a British philosopher, logician and economic theorist. He is mainly remembered for his 3 volume Logic which introduced the concept of exchangeability.

Life and career
Johnson was born in Cambridge on 23 June 1858 to William Henry Farthing Johnson and his wife, Harriet (née Brimley). He was their fifth child. The family were Baptists and political liberals.

He attended the Llandaff House School, Cambridge where his father was the proprietor and headteacher, then the Perse School, Cambridge, and the Liverpool Royal Institution School. At the age of around eight he became seriously ill and developed severe asthma and lifelong ill health. Due to this his education was frequently disrupted.

In 1879 he entered King's College, Cambridge to read mathematics having won a scholarship and was placed 11th Wrangler in 1882. He stayed on to study for the Moral Sciences Tripos from which he graduated in 1883 with a First Class degree.  He was also a Cambridge Apostle.

In 1895 he married Barbara Keymer. After her sudden death in 1904 his sister Fanny moved in with him to care for his two sons.

Having failed to win a prize fellowship, he taught mathematics. His first teaching post was as a lecturer in Psychology and Education at the Cambridge Women's Training College ,which he held for several years. He was a University Teacher of Theory of Education 1893-98 and, from 1896 until 1901, University Lecturer in Moral Sciences at the University of Cambridge. In 1902 he was elected a Fellow of King's College, and appointed to the (newly-created) Sidgwick Lecturership, positions he held until his death. In 1923 he was elected a Fellow of the British Academy.

Johnson's students included I. A. Richards, John Maynard Keynes, Frank Ramsey, Dorothy Wrinch, C. D. Broad, R. B. Braithwaite and Susan Stebbing. In 1912 (at Bertrand Russell's request) Johnson also attempted to 'coach' Ludwig Wittgenstein in logic but this was an arrangement that was both brief and unsuccessful.

He died in St Andrew's Hospital, Northampton, on 14 January 1931 and is buried at Grantchester, Cambridgeshire.

Work

Johnson, who suffered poor health, published little. That, though "very able", he was "lacking in vigour" and had "published almost nothing" is a matter Bertrand Russell commented upon unsympathetically in a letter to Ottoline Morrell of 23 February 1913. Johnson's obituary in The Times, penned by J. M. Keynes, more kindly reports that "his critical intellect did not readily lend itself to authorship". A memorial in Mind also proffered a charitable partial explanation of his reluctance to publish.

Johnson's major publication was a three volume work Logic (1921,1922, 1924) which was based on his lectures. This may never have been published if it had not been for the efforts of Newnham student Naomi Bentwich (1891–1988). Bentwich persuaded him to publish, typed and co-edited the manuscript and encouraged him to finish the project.  The preface to the first volume carries the acknowledgement: "I have to express my great obligations to my former pupil, Miss Naomi Bentwich, without whose encouragement and valuable assistance in the composition and arrangement of the work, it would not have been produced in its present form". A fourth volume on probability was never finished, but parts of it would be published posthumously as articles in Mind.

Logic ensured his election to the British Academy and won him honorary degrees from the universities of Manchester and Aberdeen. Though conceding that Logic was "dated", even at publication, Sébastien Gandon argues that it would be unfair, given "the richness of his thought", to see Johnson "only as a member of the British logic 'old guard' pushed aside by the Principia Mathematica" of Alfred North Whitehead and Bertrand Russell.  Gandon contends that "many of Johnson's insights are today an integral part of philosophy" and that this is so especially of Johnson's doctrine of determinable and determinate. Johnson's work and influence in this latter regard is discussed in the Stanford Encyclopedia of Philosophy entry on Determinables and Determinates by Jessica Wilson.

"The Logical Calculus" (1892) reveals the technical capabilities of Johnson's youth, and that he was significantly influenced by the formal logical work of Charles Sanders Peirce. The article begins as follows:

"As a material machine economises the exertion of force, so a symbolic calculus economises the exertion of intelligence ... the more perfect the calculus, the smaller the intelligence compared to the results." 

A. N. Prior's Formal Logic cites this article several times.

John Passmore tells us:
"His neologisms, as rarely happens, have won wide acceptance: such phrases as "ostensive definition", such contrasts as those between ... "determinates" and "determinables", "continuants" and "occurrents", are now familiar in philosophical literature." (Passmore, 1957, p.346)

Johnson also wrote three papers on economics. The first two, both published in the Cambridge Economic Club, being 1891's "Exchange and Distribution" and 1894's "On Certain Questions Connected with Demand" (the latter being co-written with C. P. Langer). ‘The Pure Theory of Utility Curves’ (1913) was an important paper, representing "a considerable advance in the development of utility theory". Prior to the latter he would also write fourteen entries for the first edition of R. H. Inglis Palgrave's Dictionary of Political Economy (1894-1899). He was also of particular influence on John Maynard Keynes (and had been a colleague of his father John Neville Keynes).

Select publications

 Treatise on Trigonometry (1889).
 "The Logical Calculus," Mind, Vol 1 (1892): [In 3 parts: pp. 3–30, pp. 235–250, pp. 340–357] 
"Sur la théorie des equations logiques," Bibliothèque du Congrès International de Philosophie, Volume 3, 1901, Logique et Histoire des Sciences, pp. 185–199.
"The Pure Theory of Utility Curves," The Economic Journal,  Vol. 23, No. 92 (Dec., 1913)
"Analysis of Thinking," Mind, Vol 27 (1918): [in 2 parts: pp. 1–21, pp 133–151]
Logic, Part I, (Cambridge, 1921) 
Logic, Part II, (Cambridge, 1922)
Logic, Part III, (Cambridge, 1924)
"Probability: The Relations of Proposal to Supposal.," Mind, vol. 41, no. 161, 1932, pp. 1–16,
"Probability: Axioms,"  Mind, vol. 41, no. 163, 1932, pp. 281–96,
"Probability: The Deductive and Inductive Problems," Mind, vol. 41, no. 164, 1932, pp. 409–23

References

External links
1930 photographic portrait of W. E. Johnson by Walter Stoneman at the National Portrait Gallery, London 
1915 Cambridge Moral Science Club, photo featuring Johnson (with, amongst others, G.E. Moore, Bertrand Russell, Dawes Hicks, W.R. Sorley, Karin Stephen and J. M. E. McTaggart)
 [At Internet Archive]
 Sanford, David H. (2011), Determinates vs. Determinables in the Stanford Encyclopedia of Philosophy.[Archived article now supplanted by Jessica Wilson's Determinables and Determinates (2017)]
The Story of Llandaff House and its Academy (a 'local history' article with information about Johnson's school and ancestors).

1858 births
1931 deaths
Fellows of King's College, Cambridge
British logicians
British philosophers
People educated at The Perse School